Isophyllia is a genus of stony coral in the subfamily Mussinae of the family Mussidae.

Characteristics
Isophyllia is a colonial coral. Budding is always intracalicular, occurring inside the oral disc of the polyp, within the whorl of tentacles. The corallites are meandroid, that is, they are linked in a short series of up to five centres. There are three or more cycles of septa in each corallite, all equal in size. A narrow costate coenosteum separates the corallites.

Species
The World Register of Marine Species lists the following species :

Isophyllia rigida (Dana, 1848)
Isophyllia sinuosa (Ellis & Solander, 1786)

References

Mussinae
Scleractinia genera